Christian Chukwu Okoro

(born 4 January 1951) is a Nigerian football former player and former national team coach. A defender in his playing days, he captained the Nigeria national team to its first win in the African Nations Cup.

Playing career
As a player, he became the captain of Enugu Rangers football club and the Nigeria national team in the late 1970s. He was the first Nigerian captain to lift the African Nations Cup trophy after a 3–0 victory over Algeria in the final of the 1980 tournament.

Coaching career
Chukwu started his coaching career in Lebanon in the mid-1990s, before being appointed coach of the Kenya national team in 1998. Later, from 2003 to 2005, he coached Nigeria, leading them to reach semifinals at the 2004 African Cup of Nations. During the 2006 World Cup qualification phase, Chukwu was blamed for inept coaching and management of the Nigerian national football team, and two matches before the qualifying campaign was over, he was suspended. In two matches – home and away – against eventual group winners Angola, Nigeria failed to win either one of those two encounters. This was blamed on Chukwu and those two crucial failures eventually led to Nigeria failing to qualify for the World Cup, after having appeared at all World Cup finals tournaments since their debut in 1994.

Chukwu coached Enugu Rangers to 6th place in the 2008–2009 edition of the Nigeria Premier League.  However, he was sacked on 5 August 2009 for failing to reach the club's targets for the season.

Later life
In April 2019 the Nigeria Football Federation announced that they would help Chukwu pay for his medical bills for treatment in the United States, while billionaire Femi Otedola said he would also contribute. It was later announced that he would travel for treatment in May after the required funds were raised he was cured.

References

Living people
Africa Cup of Nations-winning players
Nigerian footballers
Nigeria international footballers
1978 African Cup of Nations players
1980 African Cup of Nations players
African Games silver medalists for Nigeria
African Games medalists in football
Nigerian expatriate footballers
Nigerian football managers
Rangers International F.C. players
Expatriate football managers in Kenya
1951 births
2004 African Cup of Nations managers
Association football defenders
Competitors at the 1978 All-Africa Games